Minuscule 423 (in the Gregory-Aland numbering), Νμ60 Νι60 (in the Soden numbering), is a Greek minuscule manuscript of the New Testament, on paper. It is dated by a colophon to the year 1556.

Description 

The codex contains the text of the Gospel of Matthew and Gospel of John in two volumes on 465 + 576 paper leaves. It is written in one column per page, in 30 lines per page. The biblical text is surrounded by a catena of Nicetas.

Kurt Aland did not place the Greek text of the codex in any Category.

History 

The name of the scribe was Emmanuel.

The manuscript was added to the list of New Testament manuscripts by Scholz (1794–1852).
It was examined by Dean Burgon. C. R. Gregory saw it in 1887.

The manuscript is currently housed at the Bavarian State Library (Gr. 36.37) in Munich.

See also 

 List of New Testament minuscules
 Biblical manuscript
 Textual criticism

References

Further reading

External links 
 Minuscule 423 at the Encyclopedia of Textual Criticism

Greek New Testament minuscules
16th-century biblical manuscripts